Lal Salam is an Indian entertainment talk show hosted by actor Mohanlal on Amrita TV. The show is themed around Mohanlal's film career, it also introduces and honours humanitarians and social workers, and has other interactive and performance segments. It is the first television presentation by Mohanlal, hosted alongside Meera Nandan. The show premiered on Amrita TV on 18 August 2017, it telecast every Saturday and Sunday at 8:00 PM IST.

Concept
Lal Salam has different segments – each episode is dedicated to a renowned film of Mohanlal. Co-actors, producers, directors and other colleagues who have associated with Mohanlal in the film come to a single platform to discuss various aspects of the film such as their experience working with Mohanlal, the hard work and effort that went into the making of these films and the fun and lighter moments on the sets during the shoot of the film. The audience gets to witness these funny interactions between the actor and his colleagues.

The show also has a segment where an ardent fan of actor Mohanlal will be given an opportunity to meet him in person on the channel’s platform. Another major segment of the show honours social workers, uniformed men and other people who have done humanitarian deeds or selfless acts of service. Such personalities are invited to the show, introduced to the audience and Lal meets and honours them on stage.

Lal Salam includes music, dance and other special performance by each guest artiste who presents his/her work.

List of episodes

References

External links
 
 Amrita TV Facebook Page 
 Amrita TV Twitter

Indian television talk shows
2017 Indian television series debuts
Malayalam-language television shows
2018 Indian television series endings